Montfortista panhi, common name the cancellate false limpet, is a species of sea snail, a marine gastropod mollusk in the family Fissurellidae, the keyhole limpets and slit limpets.

Description
The size of the shell varies between 7 mm and 18 mm.

Distribution
This species occurs in the following locations:
 Red Sea
 Indo-West Pacific (Tonga Islands)

References

 Poppe G.T. & Tagaro S.P. (2020). The Fissurellidae from the Philippines with the description of 26 new species. Visaya. suppl. 13: 1-131 
 Fowler, O. (2016). Seashells of the Kenya coast. ConchBooks: Harxheim. Pp. 1–170

External links
 Quoy J.R.C. & Gaimard J.P. (1832-1835). Voyage de découvertes de l'"Astrolabe" exécuté par ordre du Roi, pendant les années 1826-1829, sous le commandement de M. J. Dumont d'Urville. Zoologie. 1
  Issel, A. (1869). Malacologia del Mar Rosso. Ricerche zoologiche e paleontologiche. Biblioteca Malacologica, Pisa. xi + 387 pp., pls 1-5
 Adams, A. & Reeve, L. A. (1848-1850). Mollusca. In A. Adams (ed.), The zoology of the voyage of H.M.S. Samarang, under the command of Captain Sir Edward Belcher, C.B., F.R.A.S., F.G.S., during the years 1843-1846. Reeve & Benham, London, x + 87 pp., 24 pls
 Pilsbry, H. A. (1890-1891). Manual of conchology, structural and systematic, with illustrations of the species. Ser. 1. Vol. 12: Stomatellidae, Scissurellidae, Pleurotomariidae, Haliotidae, Scutellinidae, Addisoniidae, Cocculinidae, Fissurellidae. pp 1-323, pls 1-65. Philadelphia, published by the Conchological Section, Academy of Natural Sciences
 841-1842). Conchologia Systematica, or complete system of conchology; in which the Lepades and conchiferous Mollusca are described and classified according to their natural organization and habits. Longman, Brown, Green, & Longman's, London. Vol. 1
 Herbert D.G. (2015). An annotated catalogue and bibliography of the taxonomy, synonymy and distribution of the Recent Vetigastropoda of South Africa (Mollusca). Zootaxa. 4049(1): 1-98
 To World Register of Marine Species
 

Fissurellidae
Gastropods described in 1834